Saeed Yousefzadeh (born January 30, 1987) is an Iranian footballer who plays for Malavan in the Persian Gulf Pro League.

Club career

Yousefzadeh joined Saipa F.C. in 2010, after spending the previous 4 seasons at Malavan.

 Assist Goals

References

External links

1987 births
Living people
Iranian footballers
Saipa F.C. players
Malavan players
Persian Gulf Pro League players
Association football midfielders